Route 34 is a state highway in the central part of the U.S. state of New Jersey. The route runs  from an intersection with Route 35 and Route 70 (the former Brielle Circle) in Wall Township, Monmouth County north to an intersection with U.S. Route 9 (US 9) in Old Bridge Township, Middlesex County. The route is a four-lane divided highway between its southern terminus and the north end of the Route 33 concurrency in Howell Township; along this stretch, the route intersects the Garden State Parkway and Interstate 195 (I-195)/Route 138 within a short distance of each other. North of Route 33, Route 34 is an undivided two- to four-lane road that intersects Route 18 in Colts Neck Township and Route 79 in Matawan. Route 34 passes through mostly suburban areas along its route.

The route was legislated in 1927 to run from Route 35 (present Route 88) in Laurelton north to Route 4 (present Route 79) in Matawan. The current alignment of Route 34 north of Matawan was a part of Route 4 (and later US 9) until it became a part of Route 4A following a realignment of US 9 and Route 4. In 1953, Route 34 was extended north along Route 4A to end at US 9 in Old Bridge Township. Meanwhile, the southern terminus was cut back to its current location with the route south of that point becoming a part of Route 70. Since 1953, the southern portion of the route was widened into a divided highway and the Brielle Circle was replaced.

Route description

Route 34 begins at an intersection with Route 35 and Route 70 in Wall Township, Monmouth County at the former Brielle Circle, heading to the northwest on a six-lane undivided road. A short distance past this intersection, the route becomes a four-lane divided highway that passes through suburban development with some woods. It passes over the Capital to Coast Trail and interchanges with County Route 524 Spur (CR 524 Spur) before reaching the Allenwood Circle, where Route 34 intersects CR 524. Past the Allenwood Circle, the road continues northwest to a partial interchange with the Garden State Parkway. This interchange has access to the northbound Garden State Parkway from northbound Route 34, to the southbound Garden State Parkway from southbound Route 34, and to both directions of Route 34 from the southbound Garden State Parkway. Immediately past this interchange, the road intersects CR 30 before coming to a cloverleaf interchange with I-195 and Route 138. Route 34 provides the missing movements between the southbound Garden State Parkway and I-195/Route 138. From here, the road passes through woodland before heading into commercial and industrial areas, where it passes by the Wall Stadium racetrack and the Monmouth Executive Airport. The route enters wooded residential and business areas where it intersects Belmar Boulevard and Megill Road, which are both distinct segments of CR 18. Route 34 continues north before it intersects Route 33 and CR 547 at the Collingwood Circle.

At the traffic circle, Route 34 turns northwest to form a concurrency with Route 33 on a four-lane divided highway that passes businesses, crossing into Howell Township and passing over the Southern Secondary railroad line operated by the Delaware and Raritan River Railroad. The two routes eventually split, with Route 34 heading north on a two-lane undivided road.  It passes through wooded areas of Naval Weapons Station Earle and enters Colts Neck Township. Upon leaving the grounds of Naval Weapons Station Earle, the route widens into a four-lane divided highway again and comes to a cloverleaf interchange with the Route 18 freeway. Past this interchange, Route 34 becomes a two-lane undivided road that passes development and Delicious Orchards before crossing CR 537. From here, the road heads past suburban neighborhoods and farmland, intersecting CR 54 before meeting CR 4. Route 34 forms a brief concurrency with CR 4 until the county route heads northeast on South Street. The route continues into wooded areas of homes, crossing into Holmdel Township, where it has a junction with CR 520.

After this intersection, the road continues past homes and farms before turning northwest and entering Marlboro Township. Here, the road heads through wooded residential and commercial areas, briefly becoming a four-lane road, before it crosses into Aberdeen Township. In Aberdeen, Route 34 heads into business areas as it crosses CR 3. The road becomes a three-lane road with a center left-turn lane, forming the border of Matawan to the west and Aberdeen Township to the east. Upon passing under the Henry Hudson Trail, the route entirely enters Matawan, continuing northwest as four-lane Middlesex Street. Here, Route 34 intersects CR 516 and Route 79 and CR 516 Spur. Following these intersection, the road heads into residential and business areas, crossing over Lake Lefferts.

Route 34 crosses into Old Bridge Township, Middlesex County, where it becomes a two-lane road, continuing through commercial areas. The route intersects CR 689, where it turns to the west and passes through areas of residences and businesses and reaches the CR 687 intersection. At the intersection with CR 699, Route 34 turns to the north and intersects another segment of CR 699 known as Spring Hill Road. The road continues north and ends at a partial interchange with US 9, with access to northbound US 9 and access from southbound US 9. Missing movements between northbound Route 34 and southbound US 9 and northbound US 9 and southbound Route 34 are provided by Perrine Road to the south.

History
The Holmdel and Middletown Point Turnpike was a turnpike chartered February 28, 1862 and ran between Holmdel Township and Middletown Point (now Matawan). The road's trajectory is now roughly followed by Route 34.

In the 1927 New Jersey state highway renumbering, Route 34 was legislated to run from an intersection with Route 35 (now Route 88 in Laurelton, Ocean County north to Route 4 (now Route 79) in Matawan, with the portion of current Route 34 north of that intersection legislated as part of Route 4. By the 1940s, US 9 was also designated along the present-day portion of Route 34 that was then a part of Route 4, this would later become Route 4A after US 9 and Route 4 were moved to a new alignment between Freehold and Cheesequake. In the 1953 New Jersey state highway renumbering, Route 34 was extended north along the alignment of Route 4A to end at US 9 in Cheesequake while the southern terminus was cut back to the Brielle Circle intersection with Route 35 and Route 70, the latter having replaced Route 34 south of this point. By 1969, Route 34 was widened into a divided highway as far north as Route 33. The Brielle Circle at the southern terminus of the route was converted into at-grade intersections with traffic lights in 2001.

Major intersections

See also

References

External links

New Jersey Roads: Route 34
New Jersey Highway Ends: Route 34
Speed Limits for Route 34

Transportation in Middlesex County, New Jersey
Transportation in Monmouth County, New Jersey
034